Thomas Dawson  was an Irish politician.

Dawson  was educated at  Trinity College, Dublin.

Dawson  represented Armagh County from 1783 to 1790, and Sligo Borough from 1873 to 1790.

References

19th-century Irish people
Alumni of Trinity College Dublin
Irish MPs 1783–1790
Members of the Parliament of Ireland (pre-1801) for County Sligo constituencies
Members of the Parliament of Ireland (pre-1801) for County Armagh constituencies